Lawriqucha River (Huánuco Quechua lawri bluish, Quechua qucha lake, lagoon, "bluish lake", hispanicized spelling Lauricocha) is a river in the Huánuco Region in Peru. It belongs to the watershed of the Marañón River. The river is named after the lake Lawriqucha or Lauricocha.

In 1952 this lake was identified as the source of the Amazon River by an English explorer, Sebastian Snow. Several other sources of the Amazon have been proposed. 
From Niñococha the river flows north through the Raura silver mine to Lake Lauricocha. Near Lauricocha Lake is a stone bridge across the river dating back to the Inca Empire and still in use for horse and foot travel and the Lauricocha caves where archaeologists have found evidence of human habitation 10,000 years ago. The river continues flowing north near the villages of Cauri (Kawri), Jesús and Jivia. Near the town of Rondos (Runtus) the Lawriqucha joins the Nupe River to form the Marañón.

References

Rivers of Peru
Rivers of Huánuco Region
Upper Amazon